R v Oakes [1986] 1 SCR 103 is a case decided by the Supreme Court of Canada which established the famous Oakes test, an analysis of the limitations clause (section 1) of the Canadian Charter of Rights and Freedoms that allows reasonable limitations on rights and freedoms through legislation if the limitation is motivated by a "pressing and substantial objective" and can be "demonstrably justified in a free and democratic society."

Background  

David Oakes of London, ON, was found to be in possession of marijuana. He was charged with unlawful possession of a narcotic for the purpose of trafficking, at the time contrary to s. 4(2) of the Narcotic Control Act. He was convicted only of unlawful possession by the trial judge. 
Section 8 of the Narcotic Control Act provides that if the Court finds the accused in possession of a narcotic, the accused is presumed to be in possession for the purpose of trafficking and that, absent the accused's establishing the contrary, he must be convicted of trafficking. Oakes' Charter challenge claimed that the reverse onus created by the presumption of possession for purposes of trafficking violated the presumption of innocence guarantee under section 11(d) of the Charter. The issues before the Court were whether section 8 of the Narcotic Control Act violated section 11(d) of the Charter and whether any violation of section 11(d) could be upheld under section 1.

Court's reasons 
The Court was unanimous in holding that the shift in onus violated both Oakes' section 11(d) rights and indirectly his section 7 rights, and could not be justified under section 1 of the Charter. This was because there was no rational connection between basic possession and the presumption of trafficking, and therefore the shift in onus is not related to the previous challenge to section 11(d) of the Charter.

The Court described the exceptional criteria under which rights could be justifiably limited under section 1. The Court identified two main functions of section 1. First, "it guarantees the rights which follow it", and secondly, it "states the criteria against which justifications for limitations on those rights must be measured".

The key values of the Charter come from the phrase "free and democratic society" and should be used as the "ultimate standard" for interpretation of section 1. These include values such as:
respect for the inherent dignity of the human person, commitment to social justice and equality, accommodation of a wide variety of beliefs, respect for cultural and group identity, and faith in social and political institutions which enhance the participation of individuals and groups in society.

Charter rights are not absolute and it is necessary to limit them in order to achieve "collective goals of fundamental importance".

The Court presents a two-step test to justify a limitation based on the analysis in R v Big M Drug Mart Ltd. First, the limitation must be motivated by "an objective related to concerns which are pressing and substantial in a free and democratic society", and second it must be shown "that the means chosen are reasonable and demonstrably justified".

The second part is described as a "proportionality test" which requires the invoking party to show:
 First, the measures adopted must be carefully designed to achieve the objective in question. They must not be arbitrary, unfair, or based on irrational considerations. In short, they must be rationally connected to the objective; 
 Second, the means, even if rationally connected to the objective in this first sense, should impair "as little as possible" the right or freedom in question; 
 Third, there must be a proportionality between the effects of the measures which are responsible for limiting the Charter right or freedom, and the objective which has been identified as of "sufficient importance".

In applying this test to the facts, the Court found that section 8 did not pass the rational connection test because the "possession of a small or negligible quantity of narcotics does not support the inference of trafficking … it would be irrational to infer that a person had an intent to traffic on the basis of his or her possession of a very small quantity of narcotics". Therefore, section 8 of the Narcotic Control Act was held to be in violation of the Charter and therefore of no force or effect.

References

External links 
 
 Full text access to over 1100 Canadian court decisions citing R. v. Oakes, sorted by most influential case

Supreme Court of Canada cases
Canadian Charter of Rights and Freedoms case law
1986 in Canadian case law
Canadian criminal case law